Azam Nazeer Tarar (Urdu) is a Pakistani politician who is currently serving as the Federal Minister of Law and Justice from April to October 2022. He is a member of the Senate of Pakistan elected from Punjab in March 2021. He is a member of Pakistan Muslim League-N. 

He served as Leader of the House in the Senate from 20 April to 30 September 2022. He also served as Vice Chairman of the Pakistan Bar Council. Tarar resigned from the post of Federal Minister of Law and Justice on 24 October 2022. He confirmed his resignation from the post to different news agencies. Azam claimed his resignation due to some personal activities but rumors says Tarar was not comfortable with the government's decision, but prime minister rejected his resignation on November 29.

He chaired a 3 people committee that was responsible for banning Wikipedia in February 2023

References

Living people
Pakistani Senators 2021–2027
Pakistan Muslim League (N) politicians
Punjabi people
Vice Chairmen of the Pakistan Bar Council
Year of birth missing (living people)
Law Ministers of Pakistan